The Frank Littleton Round Barn, also known as the "Littleton-Pulliam Round Barn", is a round barn near Mount Comfort, Indiana, United States.  Built in 1903, it was listed on the National Register of Historic Places in 1993.

At 102 feet in diameter, it is the largest round barn ever built in the state.  It was built for attorney and state legislator Frank L. Littleton, who wanted to best the accomplishment of fellow legislator, Congressman Wymond Beckett of Indianapolis, who had a 100-foot diameter barn.  The barn was built in 1902 by Isaac McHamee, his son Emery McHamee, Benton Steele, and Horace Duncan.

The barn's design was used as documentation in a U.S. patent application, "Improvements to the Self-Supported Conical Roof", a patent which was granted in 1905 to Littleton, Isaac McNamee and Horace Duncan.  A 1991 study indicates that "many farmers began building multi-sided (6, 8, 10, 12, 14 and 16-sided) barns to skirt ... infringement" upon the patent.

See also
List of round barns

References

External links

Historic American Buildings Survey in Indiana
Barns on the National Register of Historic Places in Indiana
Buildings and structures in Hancock County, Indiana
Infrastructure completed in 1903
Round barns in Indiana
National Register of Historic Places in Hancock County, Indiana